The 2021 Nur-Sultan Challenger was a professional tennis tournament played on indoor hard courts. It was the third edition of the tournament which was part of the 2021 ATP Challenger Tour. It took place in Nur-Sultan, Kazakhstan between 22 and 28 February 2021.

Singles main-draw entrants

Seeds

 1 Rankings are as of 15 February 2021.

Other entrants
The following players received wildcards into the singles main draw:
  Timofey Skatov
  Dostanbek Tashbulatov
  Denis Yevseyev

The following players received entry into the singles main draw as alternates:
  Ulises Blanch
  Wu Tung-lin

The following players received entry from the qualifying draw:
  Bogdan Bobrov
  Pavel Kotov
  Vladyslav Manafov
  Ryan Peniston

The following players received entry as lucky losers:
  Ivan Nedelko
  Roberto Quiroz

Champions

Singles

 Mackenzie McDonald def.  Jurij Rodionov 6–1, 6–2.

Doubles

 Denys Molchanov /  Aleksandr Nedovyesov def.  Nathan Pasha /  Max Schnur 6–4, 6–4.

References

2021 ATP Challenger Tour
2021 in Kazakhstani sport
February 2021 sports events in Asia